"Philly" is the fourth single by the English electronic music band Fluke. This was the band's first single to be released on a major record label, Creation Records as well as the band's first CD format released.

Versions

References 

Fluke (band) songs
1990 singles
1990 songs
Creation Records singles